Olympique Noisy-le-Sec Banlieue 93 is an association football team based in Noisy-le-Sec, France, founded in 1943. They are currently playing in Regional 1, Paris Île-de-France, the sixth tier in the French football league system, following relegation from Championnat National 3 in 2019. They play at the Stade Salvador Allende in Noisy-le-Sec.

Between 1997 and 2002 Noisy-le-Sec played in the French third division, the Championnat National.

Current squad

References

External links
 Official site

Association football clubs established in 1943
1943 establishments in France
Noisy-le-Sec
Noisy-le-Sec